The 2015 Under-21 Provincial Championship Group A was contested from 10 July to 24 October 2015. The competition (also known as the ABSA Under-21 Provincial Championship for sponsorship reasons) was the top tier of 2015 edition of the Under-21 Provincial Championship, an annual Under-21 inter-provincial rugby union competition featuring fifteen South African provincial unions.

Competition rules and information

There were seven participating teams in the 2015 Under-21 Provincial Championship Group A. These teams played each other twice over the course of the season, once at home and once away.

Teams received four points for a win and two points for a draw. Bonus points were awarded to teams that scored four or more tries in a game, as well as to teams that lost a match by seven points or less. Teams were ranked by log points, then points difference (points scored less points conceded).

The top four teams qualified for the title play-off semi-finals. The team that finished first had home advantage against the team that finished fourth, while the team that finished second had home advantage against the team that finished third. The final was played as a curtain raiser for the 2015 Currie Cup Premier Division final.

Teams

The following teams took part in the 2015 Under-21 Provincial Championship Group A competition:

Standings

The final league standings for the 2015 Under-21 Provincial Championship Group A were:

Round-by-round

The table below shows each team's progression throughout the season. For each round, their cumulative points total is shown with the overall log position in brackets:

Fixtures and results

The following matches were played in the 2015 Under-21 Provincial Championship Group A:

 All times are South African (GMT+2).

Round one

Round two

Round three

Round four

Round five

Round six

Round seven

Round eight

Round nine

Round ten

Round eleven

Round twelve

Round thirteen

Round fourteen

Semi-finals

Final

Honours

The honour roll for the 2015 Under-21 Provincial Championship Group A was:

Players

Player statistics

The following table contain points which were scored in the 2015 Under-21 Provincial Championship Group A:

Squads

The teams released the following squad lists:

Discipline

The following table contains all the cards handed out during the tournament:

Referees

The following referees officiated matches in the 2015 Under-21 Provincial Championship Group A:

See also

 Currie Cup
 2015 Currie Cup Premier Division
 2015 Currie Cup qualification
 2015 Currie Cup First Division
 2015 Under-21 Provincial Championship Group B
 2015 Under-19 Provincial Championship Group A
 2015 Under-19 Provincial Championship Group B

Notes

References

External links
 

2015 in South African rugby union
2015 rugby union tournaments for clubs
2015